Marienfeld Abbey is a Cistercian nunnery in Marienfeld, Wullersdorf, eight kilometres north of Hollabrunn. It was founded by Hans Hermann Groër as a sister house of Mariastern Abbey. Its construction began in 1974 and it was opened on 14 November 1982 by Franz König, then Archbishop of Vienna.

Cistercian nunneries in Austria
Monasteries in Lower Austria